Double Six, double six, or double sixes may refer to:

Games
Doublesix, a video game company
Boxcars (slang), a roll of two dice showing six pips on each die
Double six (dominoes), a domino set with a maximum of six pips on each tile end, or the individual domino that has six pips on both ends
In pai gow (Chinese dominoes), the Teen tile, a tile with six pips of each color

Music
Les Double Six, a French jazz group of the early 1960s
Double Six Records, a subsidiary label of Domino Records
The Double Six Club, one of the five stages of the Connect Music Festival in Scotland
Club Series Double Six, a 12-string guitar made by Burns London

Other
Double Six (TV series), broadcast in 1957 on BBC Television
Double Six Crash, an airplane crash in 1976 in Malaysia
Double Six Monument, a memorial to the airplane crash
Double Sixth Festival, traditional Chinese festival
Daimler Double-Six, one of two series of automobile engines, or the cars using these engines
Schläfli double six, two sets of six lines in space with each line crossing five from the other set
Double Six, a race horse that won the Prix de la Salamandre in 1890
Double Sixes, a race horse that was one of the Nellie Morse Stakes top three finishers in 1994
In automatic milking, a possible size of a milking parlor
The Double Six Youth Club in Woodseats, Yorkshire, England
Tune Hotel Double Six, a hotel in Bali owned by Tune Hotels